Oxacme umbrodorsum is a moth in the subfamily Arctiinae. It was described by Jeremy Daniel Holloway in 2001. It is found on Borneo and Peninsular Malaysia. The habitat consists of lower montane forests and lowland forests.

The length of the forewings is 8–9 mm for both males and females.

References

Moths described in 2001
Cisthenina